is a former Japanese football player and manager. He played for Japan national team.

Club career
Tanaka was born in Saitama on September 25, 1960. After graduating from Chuo University, he joined Nissan Motors in 1983. The club won 1983 and 1985 Emperor's Cup. From 1988 to 1990, the club won all three major title in Japan; Japan Soccer League, JSL Cup and Emperor's Cup for 2 years in a row. He was also selected Best Eleven 1989–90. In 1990s, he lost opportunity to play in the match. He moved to J1 League club Urawa Reds in 1992 and Japan Football League club Kyoto Purple Sanga in 1994. He retired in 1995.

National team career
In August 1979, when Tanaka was a Chuo University student, he was selected Japan U-20 national team for 1979 World Youth Championship and he played all 3 games. In March 1980, he was selected Japan national team for 1980 Summer Olympics qualification. At this qualification, on March 30, he debuted against Malaysia. In December, he also played at 1982 World Cup qualification. In 1984, he played at 1984 Summer Olympics qualification for the first time in 3 years. In 1985, he also played at 1986 World Cup qualification. He played 17 games for Japan until 1985.

Coaching career
After retirement, Tanaka became a manager for Japan Football League club Otsuka Pharmaceutical (later Tokushima Vortis). The club won the champions in 2003 and 2004 and was promoted to J2 League. He was sacked in September 2006.

Club statistics

National team statistics

Managerial statistics

References

External links
 
 
 Japan National Football Team Database
 
 

1960 births
Living people
Chuo University alumni
Association football people from Saitama Prefecture
Japanese footballers
Japan youth international footballers
Japan international footballers
Japan Soccer League players
J1 League players
Japan Football League (1992–1998) players
Yokohama F. Marinos players
Urawa Red Diamonds managers
Kyoto Sanga FC players
Japanese football managers
J2 League managers
Tokushima Vortis managers
Association football midfielders
Association football defenders